Sam John Troughton (born 21 March 1977) is an English actor who has made appearances in Robin Hood, Alien vs. Predator (2004), as Aleksandr Akimov in Chernobyl (2019), and as Mr. Wilder in the BBC comedy series The Outlaws (2021).

Early life
He is the son of actor David Troughton and the grandson of the second Doctor Who actor Patrick Troughton. His younger brothers are the former Warwickshire cricketer Jim Troughton, and actor William Troughton. Troughton attended Bridgetown Primary School in Stratford-upon-Avon and then Trinity Catholic School in Leamington Spa. He went on to study drama at the University of Hull, graduating in 1998.

Career
Troughton is a Shakespearean actor who has worked with the Royal Shakespeare Company, and has thrice been nominated (2000, 2001, 2002) for the Ian Charleson Awards, awarded to young actors for performances in classic plays.

In 2005, Troughton starred in the horror films Spirit Trap alongside Billie Piper, and Alien vs. Predator, and several television productions including Sky One's Hex. He has appeared in the SAS-themed drama Ultimate Force. From October 2006 he appeared in the BBC Robin Hood series (2006–2009), in which he features as Robin's ex-manservant, Much.

Troughton's stage roles include Orlando in Samuel West's production of Shakespeare's As You Like It at the Crucible Theatre in Sheffield. He returned to the RSC as part of the 2009–2011 ensemble, appearing at the Courtyard Theatre in Stratford-upon-Avon. In 2009 he played Marcus Brutus in Julius Caesar  and Third Gentleman in The Winter's Tale, and in 2010 he played Romeo in Romeo & Juliet  and King Arthur in Morte D'Arthur at the Courtyard Theatre. Other roles include a stage production of A Streetcar Named Desire in Liverpool. 

He played Thomas in Bull at the Crucible Studio Theatre in Sheffield in 2013  and Edmund in King Lear at the Royal National Theatre in January 2014.

Troughton starred in David Eldridge's new play Beginning at the Royal National Theatre and at the Ambassadors Theatre in 2018. More recently he starred in Chernobyl (2019) as Aleksandr Akimov. Between May and July 2019, he appeared in Rutherford and Son at the Royal National Theatre alongside Roger Allam.

In 2020, Troughton starred in the biographical comedy drama film Mank, alongside a cast which included Gary Oldman, Amanda Seyfried, Lily Collins and Charles Dance. In 2021, Troughton appeared as Mr.Wilder, the community service boss, in The Outlaws, a BBC series created by and starring Stephen Merchant also featuring Christopher Walken.

Filmography

Film

Television

Awards

References

External links

British male stage actors
Living people
People from Hampstead
Alumni of the University of Hull
1977 births
British male television actors
Troughton family
21st-century British male actors
British male Shakespearean actors
British male film actors